Sir Harry is the name given to nine different Thoroughbred racehorses as of 1943.

 Sir Harry (British horse), English racehorse and Epsom Derby winner, foaled in 1795
 Sir Harry (Canadian horse), won the 1927 Coffroth Handicap, the then richest race in the North America, foaled in 1924